Stranger on the Run is a 1967 American Made-for-television Western film directed by Don Siegel and starring Henry Fonda, Anne Baxter and Michael Parks. In some countries it premiered in cinemas.

Plot 
Former inmate and alcoholic Ben Chamberlain (Fonda) comes to a railway town enquiring about a woman, of whom all seem afraid to speak; he receives a beating just for asking. Chamberlain braves the threats and calls at her house; he discovers her strewn, beaten dead body. The sheriff and his posse of local thuggish enforcers, incorrectly assuming that Chamberlain is the culprit because he left town without reason, form a posse. Although they catch him in the desert, the sheriff prevents his being lynched and gives him a horse and a head-start chance to reach the border. Chamberlain meets a lonely, widowed homesteader (Baxter), a woman whose troubles also include a son who aspires to be a gunman, but does not have the steely nature it takes. Chamberlain and she start to develop a mutual attraction, but this is interrupted when the posse arrives.

Both her son and the town need a new beginning in life. If the two can survive a 20-minute gunfight before the sheriff arrives, then all may be given their last chance in life.

Cast
 Henry Fonda as Ben Chamberlain
 Anne Baxter as Valvera Johnson
 Michael Parks as Vince McKay
 Dan Duryea as O.E. Hotchkiss
 Sal Mineo as George Blaylock
 Lloyd Bochner as Mr. Gorman
 Michael Burns as Matt Johnson
 Tom Reese as Leo Weed
 Bernie Hamilton as Dickory
 Zalman King as Larkin
 Madlyn Rhue as Alma Britten
 Walter Burke as Abraham Berk
 Rodolfo Acosta as Mercurio
 George Dunn as Pilney
 Pepe Hern as Manolo

Reception
Quentin Tarantino called it Siegel's best western after Flaming Star. He stated "even though it has the Universal TV look of a The Virginian episode, it has, after Andy Robinson's performance as Scorpio in Dirty Harry, the best performance in a Siegel film. Michael Parks as stoic, resilient, walrus-mustached sheriff Vince McKay."

References

External links
 
 

1967 television films
1967 Western (genre) films
American Western (genre) television films
Films scored by Leonard Rosenman
Films directed by Don Siegel
NBC network original films
1960s English-language films